Christine Albanel (born 25 June 1955) is a French politician and civil servant. From May 2007 to June 2009, she was France's Minister for Culture and Communication in François Fillon's government.

Early career
Albanel is agrégé in classical Letters. In 1982, she joined the administration of the city of Paris, and followed Jacques Chirac – working in his cabinet – when he became Prime Minister in 1986 and French President in 1995.

In 2000, she became Conseiller d'État.

She became president of the museum and domain administration of the Palace of Versailles in 2003.

Minister of Culture
In 2007, Albanel was appointed Minister of Culture in François Fillon's government. 

During her time in office, Albanel proposed a new law (the HADOPI law) with the objective to reduce music and video piracy over the Internet, along the same 'graduated penalty' lines of thinking that previous ineffective 'DADVSI' law. This move generated huge debate as several Presumption of innocence key liberty and law principles were sacrificed for the sake of efficiency, while most experts in Internet technology said the attempt was anyway doomed as grossly underestimating the complexity of any reliable control system. As of 10 June 2009, the HADOPI law was struck down by the Constitutional Council of France. 

In 2008, Sarkozy ordered Albanel to test free admission in certain museums for six months.

Also in 2008, Albanel launched a campaign to revive the country’s art market through a battery of fiscal and financial incentives.

Lastly, Albanel is credited as a driving force behind the 2008 exhibition “Looking for Owners: Custody, Research and Restitution of Art Stolen in France During World War II” at the Israel Museum in Jerusalem.

Life after politics
After leaving government, Albanel was appointed Executive Vice-President of multi-national telecommunications corporation Orange.

Under the leadership of Anne Levade, Albanel was part of the organizing committee of the Republicans’ first-ever primary to select the party’s candidate for the 2017 presidential election.

Controversy
In early 2009, Albanel received an anonymous death threat accompanied by a 9mm-calibre bullet.

References

External links
 Biography
 Quotes

1955 births
Living people
Politicians from Toulouse
French Ministers of Culture
Union for a Popular Movement politicians
Government spokespersons of France
Women government ministers of France
Officiers of the Légion d'honneur
21st-century French women politicians
21st-century French politicians
20th-century French civil servants
21st-century French civil servants
20th-century French women